The Daxi Bridge is a suspension footbridge in Daxi District, Taoyuan City, Taiwan. It connects Rui'an Road Section 1 and Daxi Old Street. The bridge is also known as the Lover's Bridge.

History
The bridge was originally built in 1934 as a bamboo-wooden bridge constructed from bamboo frames and layered rocks. During the Japanese rule of Taiwan, the bridge was rebuilt into a dual-bored cable suspension bridge with a total length of 280 meters. After the opening of the nearby Wuling Bridge and Second Outer Ring Road, the bridge became gradually less used by the residents. It has seen been reconstructed twice due to the damage caused by typhoons. Lastly, the bridge was renovated again in 2001 after the planning from the Directorate General of Highways and its length became 330 meters.

Architecture
The bridge spans over a length of 330 meters with 13 abutments. It was designed with Baroque-style archway located at its entrance with red tiles. It is also equipped with benches for resting area. The bridge crosses the Dahan River.

Transportation
The bridge is accessible by bus from Taoyuan Station of Taiwan Railways.

See also
 
 
 
 List of bridges in Taiwan

References

1934 establishments in Taiwan
Baroque architecture in Taiwan
Bridges completed in 1934
Suspension bridges in Taoyuan City